Ellen Roosevelt won the singles tennis title by defeating reigning champion Bertha Townsend 6–2, 6–2 in the Challenge Round of the 1890 U.S. Women's National Singles Championship in front of a crowd of nearly 2,000 people. Roosevelt had won the right to challenge Townsend by defeating Lida Voorhees 6–3, 6–1 in the final of the All Comers' competition. The event was played on outdoor grass courts and held at the Philadelphia Cricket Club in Chestnut Hill, Philadelphia from June 10 through June 13, 1890.

Draw

Challenge round

All Comers' finals

References

1890
1890 in American women's sports
Women's Singles
1890 in women's tennis
Chestnut Hill, Philadelphia
1890 in Pennsylvania
Women's sports in Pennsylvania